"Whole Lotta Money" is a song by American rapper Bia, released on May 18, 2021, as the fifth single from Bia's second EP, For Certain. The song's music video was released on April 8, 2021. Following viral success on social media platform TikTok, the song's original version peaked at number three on the US Bubbling Under Hot 100 chart. A remix featuring American rapper Nicki Minaj was released on July 9, 2021, and reached number 16 of the Billboard Hot 100.

Lyrics 
In an interview with Genius, Bia said that "With this song, I really feel like wealth is in the mind. So, I didn't want people to think like, however much money you have today is how much you're gonna have tomorrow. You just gotta go get it."

Charts

Certifications

Nicki Minaj remix

On July 9, 2021, Bia released a remix of "Whole Lotta Money", featuring American rapper Nicki Minaj.

Background and release
According to Rolling Stone, "when Nicki Minaj heard “Whole Lotta Money,” she liked it so much that she reached out to the rapper on Instagram." A day prior to the song's release, Minaj went on social media to announce she would be on Instagram Live the following day to announce something very important. On the night of release, she went live with Bia to announce the release of the "Whole Lotta Money" remix.

Critical reception 
CedricCed gave "Whole Lotta Money" a B rating. According to him, "the album version without assistance from an already established rapper is much more worth listeners’ time". He added that "BIA is future-proof in the rap game if she succeeds in sustaining the momentum reached from the feature with Minaj".

The Musical Hype rated the song 4 out of 5 stars. According to him, "BIA, assisted by the ever risqué and unapologetic Nicki Minaj drop a surefire, addictive banger. It checks off the boxes with ample personality from both rappers, confident, compelling rhymes (even being shallow), and hard-nosed, minimal production."

Year-end lists

Awards and nominations

Charts

Weekly charts

Year-end charts

Release history

References

2020 songs
2021 singles
Bia (rapper) songs
Epic Records singles
Nicki Minaj songs
Songs written by Nicki Minaj